Kurt Seifert (4 July 1903 – 3 December 1950) was a German actor, singer, comedian, and in his later years, theatre director. Seifert was known as an operetta singer. From 1934 onwards he appeared in a significant number of feature films, sometimes in the lead as in Robert and Bertram (1939) but also in supporting roles.  By the time he died in 1950, he had performed in forty-five films.

Selected filmography
 The Island (1934)
 The Castle in Flanders (1936)
 Glückskinder (1936)
  (1936)
 Tango Notturno (1937)
 Sergeant Berry (1937)
 Patriots (1937)
 Nights in Andalusia (1938)
 The Roundabouts of Handsome Karl (1938)
 The Great and the Little Love (1938)
 Robert and Bertram (1939)
  (1941)
 The Gasman (1941)
 Krach im Vorderhaus (1941)
 We Make Music (1942)
 The Thing About Styx (1942)
 Somewhere in Berlin (1946)
 Peter Voss, Thief of Millions (1946)
 Anonymous Letters (1949)
 Nights on the Nile (1949)
 One Night Apart (1950)
 When Men Cheat (1950)
 Wedding with Erika (1950)
 The Black Forest Girl (1950)
 Wedding in the Hay (1951)

References

Bibliography
 O'Brien, Mary-Elizabeth. Nazi Cinema as Enchantment: The Politics of Entertainment in the Third Reich. Camden House, 2006.

External links

1903 births
1950 deaths
German male film actors
20th-century German male singers
Actors from Essen
20th-century German male actors